Natalia López Cardona (born April 23, 1999) is a Colombian lawyer, model and beauty pageant titleholder who was the 1st Runner-Up of Señorita Colombia 2021. She represented  Colombia at the Miss International 2022 pageant and finished 3rd Runner-up.

Early life 
Natalia López Cardona was born on April 23, 1999, in Circasia, Quindío, Colombia. She studied medicine at the Universidad Alexander Von Humboldt in Armenia, Quindío, Colombia for a few semesters, but later retired to start a new career, this time to become a Lawyer as her father.

Pageantry 
López was deginated as Señorita Quindío 2021 after an evaluative process of interviews, photographs and general culture.

Miss International 2022 
López represented Quindío in Señorita Colombia 2021 and finished 1st Runner-Up to Valentina Espinosa of Bolívar. She was appointed as Miss Colombia International and will represent Colombia in Miss International 2022.

On December 13, 2022, at the Tokyo Dome City Hall in Tokyo, the final of Miss International pageant was held, where 66 candidates from around the world competed for the title. At the end of the night, Natalia obtained the position of 3rd runner-up, for the second consecutive edition for Colombia.

References

External links

1999 births
Living people
Colombian beauty pageant winners
People from Quindío Department
Miss International 2021 delegates